Plaisance-du-Touch (literally Plaisance of the Touch; , Gascon: Plasença deu Toish) is a commune in the Haute-Garonne department, southwestern France. It has a fine church with a notable organ by the Toulouse builder Puget.

Population

The inhabitants of the commune are known as Plaisançois and Plaisançoises.

Geography 

The commune is traversed by the river Touch.

International relations

Plaisance-du-Touch is twinned with:
 Lingfield, United Kingdom
 Carnate, Italy
 Utebo, Spain

See also
Communes of the Haute-Garonne department

References

External links

 Professionals of Plaisance du Touch

Communes of Haute-Garonne